Daniel Lacambre is a cinematographer best known for his work for Roger Corman.

Select Credits
The Wild Racers (1968)
The Velvet Vampire (1971)
The Lady in Red (1979)
Battle Beyond the Stars (1980)

External links
Biography at BFI

American cinematographers
Year of birth missing
Possibly living people